The 2011 Crown Royal Presents the Matthew and Daniel Hansen 400 was a NASCAR Sprint Cup Series stock car race held on April 30, 2011 at Richmond International Raceway in Richmond, Virginia. Contested over 400 laps on the  asphalt D-oval, it was the ninth race of the 2011 Sprint Cup Series season. The race was won by Kyle Busch for the Joe Gibbs Racing team. Denny Hamlin finished second, and Kasey Kahne clinched third.

Report

Background

Richmond International Raceway is one of  five short tracks to hold NASCAR races; the others are Bristol Motor Speedway, Dover International Speedway, Martinsville Speedway, and Phoenix International Raceway. The track's turns are banked at fourteen degrees. The front stretch, the location of the finish line, is banked at eight degrees while the back stretch has two degrees of banking. The racetrack has seats for 97,912 spectators.

Results

Qualifying

Standings after the race

Drivers' Championship standings

Manufacturers' Championship standings

Note: Only the top five positions are included for the driver standings.

References

Crown Royal Presents the Matthew and Daniel Hansen 400
Crown Royal Presents the Matthew and Daniel Hansen 400
NASCAR races at Richmond Raceway
April 2011 sports events in the United States